A Cinderella Story is a 2004 film.

A Cinderella Story or Cinderella Story may also refer to:

 A Cinderella Story (film series), an American teen romantic comedy film series, including the first film A Cinderella Story
 A Cinderella Story (soundtrack), soundtrack for the first film
 Another Cinderella Story, 2008
 A Cinderella Story: Once Upon a Song, 2011
 A Cinderella Story: If the Shoe Fits, 2016
 A Cinderella Story: Christmas Wish, 2019
 A Cinderella Story: Starstruck, 2021
 Ever After: A Cinderella Story, 1998 film
 "A Cinderella Story", a 2008 song from Mudvayne off their album The New Game
 Cinderella story, a situation where competitors achieve far greater success than would reasonably have been expected